The Little Navajo River is a tributary of the Navajo River in Archuleta County, Colorado.  It joins the Navajo River at Chromo, Colorado.  A large portion of its water is diverted, at the Little Oso Diversion Dam, across the Continental Divide to the Rio Grande basin as part of the San Juan–Chama Project.

See also
List of rivers of Colorado

References

Rivers of Colorado
Rivers of Archuleta County, Colorado